Stephen Davies was born 28 July 1976 and is a British children's author. He lived in Burkina Faso in Africa from 2001 to 2014 and since then has lived in Battersea, London.

Books
Picture books:
 The Goggle-Eyed Goats (illustrated by Christopher Corr, Andersen Press, 2012)
 Don't Spill the Milk (illustrated by Christopher Corr, Andersen Press, 2013)
 All Aboard for the Bobo Road (illustrated by Christopher Corr, Andersen Press, 2016)

The Sophie books are adventure stories set on the edge of the Sahara desert:
 Sophie and the Albino Camel (illustrated by Dave Shelton, Andersen Press, 2006)
 Sophie and the Locust Curse (illustrated by Dave Shelton, Andersen Press, 2007)
 Sophie and the Pancake Plot (illustrated by Dave Shelton, Andersen Press, 2008)

The following are adventure stories for young adults:
 The Yellowcake Conspiracy (Andersen Press, 2007)
 Hacking Timbuktu (Andersen Press, 2009)
 Outlaw (Andersen Press, 2011)
 Blood & Ink (Andersen Press, 2015)
 The Perfect Battle of Leah Baxter (Andersen Press, 2019)

Hilda series:
 Hilda and the Hidden People (2017)
 Hilda and the Great Parade  (2018)
 Hilda and the Nowhere Space  (2019)

Stephen Davies also writes historical fiction. His bestselling book is Survivor: Titanic (Scholastic, 2018)

Awards
Africa Geographic 'Travel Writer of the Year', 2003
Glen Dimplex New Writers Award, Children's Category, 2006

Notes

References

External links
 Stephen Davies official website

1976 births
Living people
People educated at Plymouth College
Alumni of Collingwood College, Durham